Nakheel Tower was a planned skyscraper on hold in Dubai, United Arab Emirates by developer Nakheel. The project was previously called Al Burj ( "The Tower").

In January 2009, it was announced that the project was put on hold due to financial problems caused by the Great Recession. As a result of the Dubai World 2009 debt standstill, Nakheel Group's financial problems increased considerably and the tower was consequently cancelled in December 2009.

Nakheel was in talks with several potential contractors, including South Korea's Samsung C&T (who also built Burj Khalifa), Japanese Shimizu Corporation and Australian Grocon. WSP was Lead Consultant for the structure, heading a consortium that included LERA of New York and VDM of Australia, and working with architects Woods Bagot.

Location
The tower was proposed in 2003 as the centrepiece of Palm Jumeirah, one of the world's largest man-made islands. It was to be named "The Pinnacle" and rise from the centre of a canal on the trunk of the island. The height was to be  and the building was to consist of 120 floors of luxury apartments. It was replaced by the Trump International Hotel and Tower and moved to the Dubai Waterfront. Although ground leveling and land reclamation had begun on the Dubai Waterfront, construction of the tower never started because of the proximity to the Al Maktoum International Airport.

The location was changed to a plot near Jumeirah Lake Towers and Dubai Marina. The tower would have been the focal point of Nakheel's plans for the Ibn Battuta Mall development next to Jumeirah Islands and Jumeirah Lake Towers. It would have been the center of the Nakheel Harbour and Tower complex, which would have included about 20 smaller towers of up to 90 stories, a marina, and part of the Arabian Canal. The development would have been next to the revamped shopping mall.

Design
With Woods Bagot replacing Pei Partnership as the architectural partner, the latest released design had named the development Nakheel Harbour and Tower. Nakheel also claimed on their engineering page that the towers would be joined by four-level, full diameter sky bridges at approximately every twenty-five floors. The sky bridges would act to tie the buildings together structurally as well as to provide each part of the building with its own village centre in the sky. It is the four codependent foundations that would have provided the necessary structural support for such a great relative height increase over existing supertalls. The design included a distinctive crescent-shaped podium encircling the base of the tower.

The tower would have been serviced by 156 lifts at sufficient speeds and capacities to allow for travel from the ground floor to the observation deck in four minutes.

Height
Projections of Nakheel Tower's final height varied widely. Nakheel was believed to be engaging in a strategy of secrecy similar to that employed by Emaar with Burj Khalifa. Yet only a week later, Nakheel reaffirmed that the tower would be taller than 1 kilometer.

Name
During the history of the project, it was known by three different names: Al Burj, Tall Tower, and Nakheel Tower. Initially named Al Burj, the project was renamed Tall Tower for a few months, until being changed to Nakheel Tower.

See also
Nakheel Tower, Riyadh
Developments in Dubai
List of tallest buildings in Dubai
Proposed tall buildings and structures

References

External links
Dubai Waterfront website
Nakheel Properties
Nakheel Harbour Tower Renderings
Nakheel Harbour and Tower
Emporis.com database entry for Al Burj

Unbuilt buildings and structures in Dubai
Nakheel Properties
Proposed skyscrapers in Dubai
Unbuilt skyscrapers